The 8th Hollywood Music in Media Awards was held on November 17, 2017 to recognize the best in music in film, TV, video games, commercials, and trailers.

Winners and nominees

Career Achievement Honor
Dianne Warren

References

External links
Official website

Hollywood Music in Media Awards
Hollywood Music in Media Awards
Hollywood Music in Media Awards
Hollywood Music in Media Awards
Hollywood Music in Media Awards